Oxyurichthys papuensis, commonly known as the frogface goby, is a species of goby found in the Indo-West Pacific, the Red Sea south to Natal, South Africa and east to the tropical western Pacific.

References

papuensis
Fish of Africa
Fish of Southeast Asia
Fish of the Pacific Ocean
Fish of the Philippines
Fish of Bangladesh
Fish of Cambodia
Fish of China
Fish of India
Fish of Indonesia
Taxa named by Achille Valenciennes
Fish described in 1837